Artiom Kiouregkian (born 9 September 1976) is an Armenian-born Greek wrestler. He won a bronze medal at the 2004 Summer Olympic Games in the Greco-Roman featherweight division.

Biography
Kyuregyan was born on 9 September 1976 in Leninakan (now Gyumri), Armenia. He took up Greco-Roman wrestling at the age of 6 years under Khachatur Vardanyan. From 1992 to 1999 he lived in Ulyanovsk, Russia, where he was trained at Dynamo club by Anatoly Vinnik. In 1997 he placed second at the Russian championships. In 1999 he moved to Greece, where he continued wrestling under the guidance of his cousin Arutika Rubenian.

The greatest success of his career came in 2004. At the European Wrestling Championships in Haparanda he reached the final. At the 2004 Summer Olympics in Athens, he won his first three bouts, then lost in the semifinal, and won a bronze medal match.

In 2001–2007 Kyuregyan competed for the German club KSV Aalen, and then in 2010–2011 for RKG Freiburg.

References

External links
 

1976 births
Living people
Sportspeople from Gyumri
Armenian male sport wrestlers
Greek male sport wrestlers
Olympic wrestlers of Greece
Wrestlers at the 2004 Summer Olympics
Olympic bronze medalists for Greece
Olympic medalists in wrestling
Medalists at the 2004 Summer Olympics
Naturalized citizens of Greece
Greek people of Armenian descent
European Wrestling Championships medalists